Strafe is an American old-school electro group that gained popularity in the mid-1980s. The group is primarily known for its single "Set It Off" (1984) which has been extensively sampled by hip-hop, house, techno, and EDM artists.

Songs that have sampled "Set It Off" include the following
 "The Party": 1988 song by Kraze
 Maestro Fresh Wes – Let Your Backbone Slide
 "Let the Beat Hit 'Em": 1991 song by Lisa Lisa and Cult Jam
 "Here We Go (Let's Rock & Roll)": 1991 song by C+C Music Factory
 "Get Up!": 1996 song by Etienne Picard
 "Changes": 1998 song by Tupac Shakur
 "Set It Off": 1998 song by Das EFX
 "Feelin' So Good": 1999 song by Jennifer Lopez
 "I like Dem Girlz": 2000 song by Lil Jon & the East Side Boyz from the Big Momma's House movie soundtrack
 "Get It Off": 2003 song by Monica
 "Outta Control": 2005 song by 50 Cent
 "Ride It": 2019 song by DJ Regard

Partial discography
"Set it off" (12-inch single) (Jus Born Productions, 1984)
"Comin’ from Another Place" (12-inch single) (A&M Records, 1985)
"React" (12-inch single) (A&M Records, 1985)
"Outlaw" (12-inch single) (A&M Records, 1987)

References

American hip hop groups
American electro musicians
A&M Records artists